Rutherglen  is a small town in north-eastern Victoria, Australia, near the Murray River border with New South Wales. The town was named after the Scottish town of Rutherglen which lies just outside Glasgow.

Features

Rutherglen is located north of Wangaratta and west of Wodonga, just 10 kilometres from the Murray River at the border towns of Wahgunyah and Corowa.

Originally a gold-mining town of the mid-19th century, it has since developed into a major wine-producing area, with 17 wineries all located within a short drive from the town centre.

The main street of Rutherglen maintains its historical charm, with most of the shop fronts retaining the same look they had a century ago. Attractions within the town include Lake King which is surrounded by Apex Park and Rutherglen Park, as well as the historical wine-bottle-shaped water tower in Campbell Street.

History

Rutherglen Post Office opened on 1 November 1860.

The Rutherglen Magistrates' Court closed on 1 January 1990.

Wine

The Rutherglen wine region is a wine-producing area around the town of Rutherglen and is particularly noted for its sweet fortified wine styles including Muscat, Topaque (formerly known as Tokay) and Port.

The largest winery in the region is the All Saints Winery, located just a short drive north-west outside of Wahgunyah. Established in 1864, it features landscaped gardens, ponds, a restaurant and wine tasting facilities. The Rutherglen Wine Experience Visitor Information Centre, located in the town centre on Main Street, offers displays of the town's rich history, how wines are made, and comprehensive tourist information.

Sport
The town in conjunction with nearby town Corowa has an Australian Rules football team (Corowa-Rutherglen) competing in the Ovens & Murray Football League. Another Australian rules football team, Rutherglen Football Club, play in the Tallangatta & District Football League.

Golfers play at the course of the Rutherglen Golf Club on Murray Street.  The current club professional is Paul Black.

Climate

Rutherglen features a mediterranean climate (Csa) with hot, dry summers and cool, damp winters. Climate data are sourced from Rutherglen Research; established in 1912 and still operating today.

Notable people
Sir John Harris (1868–1946), politician and sherry pioneer
Michael Joseph Savage (1872–1940), Prime Minister of New Zealand, lived at North Prentice
Erle Cox (1873–1950), author
Robert Campbell (born 1982), former Hawthorn footballer

Festivals and events
Rutherglen Regatta: second weekend of January
Tastes of Rutherglen: second weekend of March - third weekend of March
Winery Walkabout: Queen's Birthday long weekend of June
Rutherglen Agricultural Show: third weekend of October
Tour de Rutherglen: first weekend of November
Rutherglen Farmers Market: second weekend each month

See also
 Australian wine

References

Heritage citation for the Victoria Hotel in the National Trust (Victoria) Register
Wine styles of Rutherglen by Australian wine critic, James Halliday
Rutherglen Tokay and Muscat by U.S. wine critic Robert M. Parker, Jr.
Wine styles of Rutherglen by Australian wine critic, James Halliday
Rutherglen Tokay and Muscat by U.S. wine critic Robert M. Parker, Jr.

External links
Rotary Club of Rutherglen

Towns in Victoria (Australia)
Shire of Indigo
Mining towns in Victoria (Australia)